Mary Freehill (born 22 July 1946) is a Dublin City Councillor and was the 329th Lord Mayor of Dublin, serving during the Millennium Year from 5 July 1999 to 3 July 2000. She is the Labour Party Councillor for the Kimmage-Rathmines Ward on Dublin City Council.

Freehill was born and went to school in the town of Ballyconnell, County Cavan. Her parents were Bernard Freehill, a building contractor and Kathleen Freehill (nee Donohoe) of Daisy Hill, Ballyconnell. 

Freehill was elected to the city council in 1977 to 1985 for Pembroke Ward and was re-elected for Rathmines Ward in 1991. She has since been re-elected at each subsequent local election (1999, 2004, 2009, 2014, 2019) for the same area, despite shifting ward boundaries. As Lord Mayor of Dublin City, she awarded the Freedom of the City to Nobel Peace Prize winner and Burma's pro-democracy leader Aung San Suu Kyi and also to the rock band U2.

References

External links 
Labour Party profile

1946 births
Living people
Lord Mayors of Dublin
Labour Party (Ireland) politicians